House-Museum of Uzeyir Hajibeyov is the museum located in Shusha of Uzeyir Hajibeyov – an Azerbaijani composer, musicologist, publicist, playwright, teacher and public figure, founder of the professional musical art of the modern Azerbaijan and of the national opera.

The museum functioned between 1959 and 1992. After the occupation of Shusha by the Armenian armed forces, it ceased its activities. The museum building was destroyed and the exhibits were looted. Only 136 items out of 1700 were saved.

After the liberation of the city of Shusha by the Azerbaijani army on 7 November 2020, the restoration works of the museum began.

History and description 
After the death of Uzeyir Hajibeyov (23 November 1948), the Council of Ministers of the Azerbaijan SSR adopted a resolution to perpetuate his memory (16 February 1949). The Paragraph 4 of the ordinance stated:

The house where the composer spent his childhood and youth was built in the 19th century. The house-museum began functioning in 1959 with the support of the Azerbaijan Academy of Sciences, the Azerbaijan History Museum, the Ministry of Culture and the Music Fund. In the beginning, the museum consisted of 4 rooms. Subsequently, by the centenary of the composer in 1985, the museum was expanded, being turned into a Memorial House with two-story and one-story parts. The organizations that were subordinated to the Ministry of Culture, in particular the Museum of History of Azerbaijan, transferred a number of items belonging to the composer to the house-museum of Hajibeyov. A plaster statue of Hajibeyov was also installed in the museum. In 1978, the house-museum was renovated, and a spring complex was built in the yard. In 1985, UNESCO widely celebrated the centenary of Uzeyir Hajibeyov. Guests from many countries visited the house-museum of Hajibeyov in Shusha where anniversary events were held. The museum operated until the occupation of the city of Shusha in 1992 by the armed forces of Armenia. After that, the museum continued its activities in the house-museum of Hajibeyov located in the city of Baku.

After the liberation of the city of Shusha (7 November 2020) by the Azerbaijani armed forces, there was approved a project to restore the house-museum of Uzeyir Hajibeyov in 2021. Currently, there are ongoing reparation and restoration works.

Exhibition 
Valuable materials related to the first years of Uzeyir Hajibeyov's life were presented here - exhibits regarding his student years, photographs of relatives and family members, manuscripts of the first works, as well as the personal belongings of the composer reflecting his activities. In the second, third and fourth rooms, exhibits regarding Hajibeyov's life and work during the Soviet period were exposed. A statue of the composer was installed in the second room.

Before the occupation of the city of Shusha by the Armenian armed forces, the museum had about 1700 exhibits. After the city was occupied, only 136 exhibits of the museum in Shusha were transported to Baku, namely to the house-museum of Hajibeyov. All other exhibits were destroyed.

Photogallery 
Museum building destroyed during the occupation:

See also
 Monuments of Shusha
 Uzeyir Hajibeyov's House Museum

References

Buildings and structures in Azerbaijan
Museums established in 1959
Historic house museums in Azerbaijan
Museums in Shusha